Kay Worthington (born December 21, 1959) is a Canadian rower and Olympic champion. She won two gold medals at the 1992 Summer Olympics. Worthington was made a member of the Canadian Olympic Hall of Fame in 1994 and Canada’s Sports Hall of Fame in 2013.

References

1959 births
Rowers from Toronto
Canadian female rowers
Olympic rowers of Canada
Olympic gold medalists for Canada
Rowers at the 1984 Summer Olympics
Rowers at the 1988 Summer Olympics
Rowers at the 1992 Summer Olympics
Medalists at the 1992 Summer Olympics
Olympic medalists in rowing
Living people
20th-century Canadian women